Peter Dankelson (born 2000) is a guitar player, motivational speaker and author from Libertyville, Illinois. He was born with several birth defects including a severe facial deformity called Goldenhar syndrome. He is co-owner of Pete's Diary LLC, which publishes, distributes, and manages his books and music. Pete's Diary is also the name of his band. MusicRadar named him one of "The 13 best online guitar personalities of 2020".

Early life
Dankelson was born in Michigan in the year 2000. He was born 10 weeks early and weighed less than three pounds. He was born with numerous birth defects such as microtia, atresia and most notably Goldenhar syndrome: he has had 36 surgeries to correct his facial deformity. He was born without a left ear or left ear canal. At birth, he needed tracheostomy surgery.

When he was in high school he and his family moved to Libertyville, Illinois. In high school he had surgery to install a bone anchored hearing aid called the Baha 5 Sound Processor. He attended Libertyville High School. 

He is a member of the Children's Craniofacial Association.

Career
He is a musician and a motivational speaker. He operates a motivational website called Pete's Diary. On the Pete's Diary website Dankelson states that he began playing guitar when he was 15 years old. He claims to have 700,0000 social media followers. In December 2022 MusicRadar published an article titled "The 13 best online guitar personalities of 2020, as voted by you". They named Peter Dankelson (Pete's Diary) 3rd on their list.

Dankelson is the subject of two books. He co-wrote "How I Learned To Rock My Life: The Peter Dankelson Story". His mother and business partner Dede Dankelson wrote the book "Peter's Rockin' Ear: A Story of Self-Acceptance"

See also
Children's Craniofacial Association

References

External links
Video Joe Bonamassa - Josh Smith - Kirk Fletcher - Peter Dankelson

Guitarists from Illinois
21st-century guitarists
2000 births
Living people